Kennedia prorepens is a species of flowering plant in the family Fabaceae and is endemic to Australia. It is a prostrate, multi-stemmed shrub with trifoliate leaves and pale blue, violet or maroon flowers.

Description

Taxonomy
This species was first formally described in 1874 by Ferdinand von Mueller, who gave it the name Caulinia prorepens in Fragmenta Phytographiae Australiae. In 1882, von Mueller changed the name to Kennedia prorepens. The specific epithet (prorepens) means "forwards-creeping".

Distribution and habitat
Kennedia prorepens is widespread in Western Australia, its range extending to the south of the Northern Territory, north-western South Australia and western Queensland.

References

prorepens
Fabales of Australia
Flora of New South Wales
Plants described in 1874
Taxa named by Ferdinand von Mueller